Bellegarde-sur-Valserine (literally Bellegarde on Valserine) is a former commune in the Ain department in the Auvergne-Rhône-Alpes region in Eastern France. In 2019, it had a population of 11,326. On 1 January 2019, it was merged into the new commune of Valserhône.

Geography
Bellegarde is located at the confluence of the Valserine and the Rhône.

At this spot, the water of the two rivers runs underground; it was possible to cross both of them easily. Since the inception of the Génissiat Dam at Injoux-Génissiat, the level of the Rhône was raised several metres and the Perte du Rhône submerged. A smaller similar feature, the Pertes de la Valserine, on the former border with Lancrans, is still visible.

Bellegarde lies in a valley dominated by the Plateau of Retord on the west and the massif of the Grand Crêt d'Eau and the Vuache on the east. The passage created by the Rhône is the principal access to the area around Gex and the north of Lake Geneva. Since 1 January 2019, Bellegarde belongs to a new commune, with Lancrans and Châtillon-en-Michaille, named Valserhône.

Climate 
Bellegarde is under the influence of both an oceanic climate (notable precipitations in quantity and frequency) and a warm-summer humid continental climate (cold winters and warm to hot summers).

Transport
Bellegarde station has rail connections to Paris, Lyon, Annemasse, Geneva, Chambéry and several regional destinations. It lies on the Lyon–Geneva railway.

Population

Twin towns — sister cities
Bellegarde-sur-Valserine is twinned with:

  Saint-Christophe, Aosta Valley, Italy (2000)
  Bretten, Germany (2001)

References

Former communes of Ain
Bugey
Populated places disestablished in 2019